During 2001 and 2002, the Australian radio station ABC Classic FM held a Classic 100 countdown.

Voting for the countdown was held in 2001, with votes cast by listeners to the station.

The broadcasting of the results of the countdown began on 12 December 2001 and concluded on 19 January 2002.

Survey summary
The results of the countdown are as follows:

By composer
The following 45 composers were featured in the countdown:

See also
Classic 100 Countdowns

References

External links

Classic 100 Countdowns (ABC)
2001 in Australian music